Josiah Stoddard Johnston (November 24, 1784May 19, 1833) was a United States representative and Senator from Louisiana. Born in Salisbury, Connecticut, he moved with his father to Kentucky in 1788, and went to Connecticut to attend primary school. He graduated from Transylvania University (Lexington, Kentucky) in 1802, studied law, was admitted to the bar, and commenced practice in Alexandria, Louisiana (then the Territory of Orleans). He was a member of the Territorial legislature from 1805 to 1812 and during the War of 1812 raised and organized a regiment for the defense of New Orleans, but reached the city after the battle. He engaged in agricultural pursuits and was a State district judge from 1812 to 1821.

Johnston was elected to the Seventeenth Congress, serving from March 4, 1821 to March 3, 1823; he was an unsuccessful candidate for reelection in 1822 to the Eighteenth Congress. In 1824 he was appointed to the U.S. Senate to fill the vacancy caused by the resignation of James Brown; he elected to the Senate in 1825 and was reelected in 1831, serving from January 15, 1824, until his death, caused by an explosion on the steamboat Lioness, on the Red River in Louisiana, May 19, 1833. While in the Senate he was chairman of the Committee on Commerce (Nineteenth Congress); interment was in Rapides Cemetery, Pineville, Louisiana.

Family
His half-brother, Albert Sidney Johnston, was a Confederate Army general during the American Civil War. His son, J. Stoddard Johnston (1833–1913), a journalist and editor, also served during the War, eventually becoming Kentucky's Secretary of State.

See also

 List of United States Congress members who died in office (1790–1899)

References

External links
 

1784 births
1833 deaths
People from Salisbury, Connecticut
United States senators from Louisiana
American people of the War of 1812
Transylvania University alumni
Burials at Cave Hill Cemetery
Accidental deaths in Louisiana
Deaths due to ship fires
Louisiana National Republicans
National Republican Party United States senators
Democratic-Republican Party members of the United States House of Representatives from Louisiana
19th-century American politicians